Chondrostegoides is a genus of moths in the family Lasiocampidae. The genus was erected by Per Olof Christopher Aurivillius in 1905.

Species
Chondrostegoides capensis Aurivillius, 1905
Chondrostegoides jamaka Zolotuhin, 2007
Chondrostegoides magna Zolotuhin, 2007
Chondrostegoides nobilorum Zolotuhin, 2007
Chondrostegoides ruficornis Aurivillus, 1921

External links

Lasiocampidae